Kazandibi or kazan dibi (lit. 'bottom of kazan or cauldron') is a Turkish dessert and a type of caramelized milk pudding. It is developed in the kitchens of the Ottoman Palace and one of the most popular Turkish desserts today.

It is traditionally made by burning the bottom of tavuk göğsü. A variant of kazandibi uses muhallebi instead.

See also
 List of Turkish desserts

References 

Turkish puddings